The Conquest of Sylhet predominantly refers to an Islamic conquest of Srihatta (present-day Sylhet, Bangladesh) led by Sikandar Khan Ghazi, the military general of Sultan Shamsuddin Firoz Shah of the Lakhnauti Sultanate, against the Hindu king Gour Govinda. The conquest was aided by a Muslim saint known as Shah Jalal, who later ordered his disciples to scatter throughout eastern Bengal and propagate the religion of Islam. The Conquest of Sylhet may also include other minor incidents taking place after Govinda's defeat, such as the capture of nearby Taraf.

Background

The Greater Sylhet region historically consisted of many Hindu petty kingdoms such as Srihatta (Gour), Laur and Jaintia. Govinda was a conservative Hindu ruler of the Gour Kingdom, intolerant and harsh towards other faiths such as Islam, Buddhism and even certain denominations of Hinduism. It was known by his people that Govinda practiced magic which he had learnt in the mountains of Kamaru and was religiously and militarily educated for twelve years in the Kamakhya Temple, and Kulsia Ashram (on the banks of the Kulsi River in modern-day Sualkuchi or Kulsi Reserve Forest) respectively. During his reign, he built forts all over his kingdom and established many military training camps. He is famously known to have built a seven-storey brick tower.

There was a small minority of Muslim families living in the country, following the short-lived Azmardan Invasion in 1254 led by the Governor of Bengal, Malik Ikhtiyaruddin Iuzbak. The Gour Kingdom bordered the independent Bengali principality of Lakhnauti ruled by the Muslim Sultan Shamsuddin Firoz Shah of the Balban dynasty. The war began when Burhanuddin, a Muslim living in the village of Tultikar, sacrificed a cow for his newborn son's aqiqah or celebration of birth. Govinda, in a fury for what he saw as sacrilege due to his Hindu beliefs, had the newborn killed as well as having Burhanuddin's right hand cut off. Shortly after this incident, Qadi Nuruddin of Taraf celebrated his son's marriage ceremony by slaughtering a cow for them to eat. The Qadi was executed by the feudal ruler Achack Narayan. After both men being punished, Burhanuddin and Nooruddin's brother, Helimuddin, travelled to lower Bengal where they addressed their issued with Sultan Shamsuddin Firoz Shah.

At the same time, a Sufi missionary by the name of Shah Jalal was due to arrive in the region of Bengal. After being commanded by his uncle, Sheikh Kabir before his journey to reside and propagate Islam in a region in which the soil matches the one that was given to him in his home country, Shah Jalal knew that it is in Srihatta where he shall reside in for the rest of his life. Shah Jalal journeyed eastward and reached India in c. 1300, where he met many great scholars and Sufi mystics.

Conquest of Gour

As Govinda's minister, Mona Rai, was based near the port, Rai decided to stop river transport and ferries making it difficult for the opponents as the only other option was through the hills. When word of this reached Sultan Shamsuddin Firoz Shah, the commanded his nephew Sikandar Khan Ghazi to lead an army against the Raja. Sikandar marched with his soldiers towards the low-lying hills of Sylhet via Mymensingh. Govinda appointed Chakrapani as his commander-in-chief. The army was confronted by Govinda's skilful archery. Govinda's army was noted as Bengal's first army which practised the skillful art of archery. The Bengali army, inexperienced in the foreign terrain which consisted of many low-lying hills and valleys, were brought to utter shame by Govinda's archers and had no option but to retreat back to Muslim Bengal to avoid casualties.

The Sultan was not happy at all with the result of the first battle and decided that the army should train and prepare before readying themselves for another battle. In the second expedition, Sikandar took the same recognised route through Mymensingh. As the army marched through the hills, a storm took place. Due to heavy rainfall and flooding, nearly half of the army died by the time Sikandar reached Govinda. Govinda's massive war boats looked as if they were floating forts on the water according to the  Gulzar-i-Abrar, a Muslim account of the war. They were defeated once again and Sikandar retreated back to Bengal for a second time, humiliated by what had occurred.

Firoz Shah then turned to his Sipah Salar (commander-in-chief) Syed Nasiruddin as he realised that this undertaking was much bigger than he anticipated and he would need a larger and more skilled army. The two armies decided to attack together but it ended in failure due to Govinda's superior military strategy. Govinda's family rejoiced over the three consecutive victories and his aunt Apurna, the queen-mother and wife of the previous Raja Govardhan, celebrated by building a large 20-acre water tank in Ambarkhana known as Rajar Mar Dighi.

Nasiruddin then returned to Bengal where he heard of the arrival of the famous saint Shah Jalal, as well as his companions who at this point numbered around 360. Shah Jalal was famed for his strong physique and tall stature, and the army decided to spend a night in his company. A much larger army was made, and this new and improved army travelled to Sylhet via Cumilla and Habiganj. The army was then guided through Sylhet once again by Ghazi Burhanuddin, ultimately arriving at the banks of the Barak River. They set their camp on top of a small hillock, northwest of the Kangsa-Nisudhana temple. From here the third battle was fought between Gour Govinda and the combined armies of Shah Jalal and Syed Nasiruddin, with the latter forces ultimately claiming victory. Shah Jalal called out the adhan as the time for salah approached and the army were able to destroy Govinda's 7-storey Gorduar palace. After hearing that his commander Mona Rai was killed, Govinda was forced to retreat and Srihatta was brought under Muslim control. According to tradition, another disciple of Shah Jalal, Shah Chashni Pir at this point compared the soil in Srihatta with that which was previously given by Ahmad Kabir, finding them to be identical. In any case, following the battle, Shah Jalal along with his followers permanently settled in Sylhet.

Govinda retreated with his family to Harong Hurong cave in Mulnicherra. He then went to the shrine of Grivakali, where he left his aunt, Apurna, and his cousin Garuda and cousin-in-law Shantipriya (or Shantirani) in the care of the priest. Following this, he took his wife, Hiravati, and son, Nirvana, with him to Kamrup.

Capture of Taraf

Garuda and his family, taking shelter at Grivakali shrine, then decided to head off to Tungachal. They set on a boat at Dhanuhatta driven by the royal servants Ghaturam and Jharuram. However, they were seen by Subid, a rebel from the time of Raja Govardhan's fall, who informed the Muslims of their actions; leading to Garuda's boat being followed by the Muslims. Out of embarrassment, Garuda appeared to committed suicide, jumping off the boat at Puni beel. The boatmen, however, continued taking Apurna and Shantipriya to Tungachal, eventually finding refuge with Raja Achak Narayan, though the boatmen themselves were killed. Apurna and Shantipriya made a vow in Tunganath Shiva temple to fast for ninety days, hoping for safety. The incident is mentioned in a ballad known as Shantiranir Baromashi (Shantirani's twelve months). After the successful conquest of Gour, Syed Nasiruddin set off on an expedition against the feudal Raja Achak Narayan of Tungachal, which had been a part of the Gour Kingdom. Nasiruddin arrived with 1000 lascars and 12 Saints sent by Shahjalal (r) to help him. He camped in a place now known as Laskarpur. Raja Achak Narayan was also defeated and fled with his family to Mathura. Shantipriya was said to have also committed suicide. Following a victory, Tungachal was annexed to Bengal and renamed as Taraf. The 12 saints who accompanied Nasiruddin are as follows:

Shah Arifin (buried in Tahirpur)
Shah Tajuddin Qureshi (buried in Chowkhi Pargana, Sylhet)
Shah Ruknuddin Aswari (buried in Sarail)
Shah Badr (buried in Badarpur, Karimganj, India)
Shah Mahmud (buried in Urdu Bazar, Laskarpur)
Shah Sultan (buried in Badarpur, Mymensingh)
Shah Ghazi (buried in Bishgram, Sylhet)
Shah Badruddin (buried in Bakhshirghat, Chittagong)
Shah Majlis Amin (buried in Shankarpasha, Habiganj Sadar)
Shah Fateh Ghazi (buried in Fatehpur-Shahjibazar, Madhabpur)
Syed Shah Saif Minnatuddin (buried in Laskarpur)
Syed Ahmad Gesudaraz (buried in Kharampur Mazar Sharif, Brahmanbaria)

Aftermath

Gour and Taraf were then incorporated into Shamsuddin Firoz Shah's kingdom with Sikandar Khan Ghazi being the first Wazir of Sylhet. Gour was nicknamed Jalalabad after Shah Jalal for his aid in delivering Islam to the population. To this day, the remains of Gour Govinda's fort can be found in Chowhatta, Sylhet. Many of Shah Jalal's companions migrated to other places in Eastern India to preach the religion of Islam. The Muslims were not interested in conquering other neighbouring kingdoms such as Laur, Jaintia and Twipra, which would be conquered much later during Mughal rule and British rule.

See also

Muharram Rebellion
Nankar Rebellion
Revolt of Radharam

References

Sylhet
Sylhet
History of Sylhet
Sylhet
History of Islam in Bangladesh